Mohamad Suleman Hidayat  (born December 2, 1944) is an Indonesian businessman and politician from Jombang, East Java. He was part of the Second United Indonesia Cabinet and has served as Minister of Industry in Indonesia since October 22, 2009. He previously served as chairman of KADIN from 2004  and as chairman of Real Estate Indonesia (1989–1992) and vice chairman of the Asia Pacific Real Estate Federation (APREF).

References

1944 births
Living people
Indonesian Muslims
Indonesian businesspeople
People from Jombang Regency
Industry ministers of Indonesia